Miranda Robertson is a scientific editor. She is known for serving as Biology Editor at Nature from 1983 to 1992, during which time Nature's visibility and influence in the life sciences substantially increased, and for her contributions to the influential textbook Molecular Biology of the Cell. As editor of BMC's open-access Journal of Biology, she introduced pioneering improvements in the process of peer review, including the ability for authors to opt out of re-review.

Early life and family 
Robertson was the daughter of S. Anthony (Tony) Barnett, a zoologist specializing in rat behavior who was also a prolific author and broadcaster. He was born in Hertfordshire and moved to Canberra in 1971 to take up a position at the Australian National University, where he served as Professor of Zoology until his retirement. Her mother was Marjorie Phillips, who worked with pioneering educator John Newsom when he was County Education Officer for Hertfordshire during the Second World War. Her uncle, James Barnett, was a yeast biologist.

Career 

Robertson joined Nature in 1970 during John Maddox's first term as Editor. As a member of the Biology Team and subsequently Biology Editor, she frequently wrote articles for Nature's News and Views series highlighting important recent developments in a variety of areas, including immunology, development, the molecular mechanisms of disease, and early efforts in artificial intelligence, in vitro fertilisation and gene therapy. In 1973, when Maddox was replaced by David Davies, Nature instituted systematic peer review of submitted manuscripts. Under Davies, and subsequently in Maddox's second term, the selectivity of publication decisions dramatically increased. As the difficulty and importance of these decisions increased, Robertson developed strong relationships with many key figures in the biological community to improve decision-making. Noted theoretical biologist Robert May described Robertson as "exceptionally good and well informed" in explaining his willingness to write an unusually large number of News and Views pieces for Nature. She knew Francis Crick both professionally and through family connections, and wrote a "brief and superficial impression" of his life and work after his death in 2004.

In 1976, while still at Nature, Robertson began to work with a team of scientists led by Bruce Alberts and James Watson on a new textbook, Molecular Biology of the Cell, which was published by Garland Science in 1983. As the developmental editor, she organized an unprecedentedly large and diverse network of university undergraduate students and teachers to provide feedback on drafts of chapters. In the preface of the first edition, the authors wrote: "Most of the advice obtained from students and outside experts was collected and digested by Miranda Robertson. By insisting that every page be lucid and coherent, and rewriting many of those that were not, she has played a major part in the creation of a textbook that undergraduates will read with ease." The book was praised by reviewers for its "unobtrusively lucid style, which is the mark of much tender loving care" and was later called “the most influential cell biology textbook of its time”.

In 1992 Robertson left Nature and joined Garland Science. Because of her standing in the biology community and the example set by Molecular Biology of the Cell, she was able to partner with several noted biologists to create new textbooks.  She played an important part in the development of Immunobiology by Charles Janeway and Paul Travers, and edited two editions of Introduction to Protein Structure by Carl Branden and John Tooze. In 1996 Garland Science was acquired by Taylor & Francis.

In 1998 Robertson joined New Science Press as Managing Director, where she initiated a series of Primers in Biology with a modular design intended to make teaching easier.  The series included "Protein Structure and Function" by Gregory Petsko and Dagmar Ringe and "The Cell Cycle: Principles of Control" by David Morgan.  She also co-authored Immunity: The Immune Response to Infectious and Inflammatory Disease with Anthony DeFranco and Richard Locksley.

In 2008, Robertson moved to New Science Press's sister company, BioMedCentral, the first fully open-access publisher. As Editor of Journal of Biology, which later merged with BMC Biology, Robertson introduced a number of editorial innovations, including a policy allowing authors to opt out of re-review after responding to reviewers' comments, arguing that "pit-bull reviewing" did not serve the community well. This policy was catalyzed by a situation of a highly delayed second review, reported to Robertson by Peter Walter. Announcing the new policy in 2009, Robertson commented that it is "the job of journal editors to promote the dissemination of research results rather than to obstruct it, [and] it is the author who is in the end accountable for the quality and validity of the paper that is published." Robertson also introduced a checklist for documenting that submitted papers meet reporting standards for reproducibility and the ability for researchers to pre-register their planned course of research. Robertson's editorials often focused on open questions and unacknowledged "dirty secrets", using Sydney Brenner's term "Ockham's Broom" to refer to the practice of sweeping inconvenient facts under the rug.

In 2017, Robertson announced her retirement from BMC Biology and was replaced as Editor by Mirna Kvajo.

References 

Academic journal editors
1945 births
Living people